Jukka Tapio "J." Karjalainen (born 1 April 1957) is a Finnish singer-songwriter. His first album came out in 1981 and he has been called the "Bruce Springsteen of Finland." He states that his music is a mix of "Blues, Rock´n´roll, Folk, Country, Soul, Funky, New Orleans stuff." He also listened to old-time musicians like Tommy Jarrell and Clarence Ashley while learning the 5-string banjo. Jukka is married to Kati Bergman, and they have a son, Väinö Karjalainen, who is also a musician and music producer.

Discography

Studio albums 
as J. Karjalainen ja Mustat Lasit
1981: J. Karjalainen ja Mustat Lasit (J. Karjalainen and The Dark Glasses)
1982: Yö kun saapuu Helsinkiin (When The Night Comes to Helsinki)
1983: Tatsum tisal ( Krad Sessalg) 
1985: Doris
1986: Varaani (Monitor Lizard)
1987: Kookospähkinäkitara (Coconut guitar)
1988: Lumipallo (Snowball)
as J. Karjalainen (1st period)
1990: Keltaisessa talossa (In The Yellow House)
J. Karjalainen yhtyeineen (J. Karjalainen and His Band)
1991: Päiväkirja (Diary)
1992: Tähtilampun alla (Under The Star Lantern)
1994: Villejä lupiineja (Wild Lupins)
as J. Karjalainen Electric Sauna
1996: J. Karjalainen Electric Sauna
1998: Laura Häkkisen silmät (Eyes of Laura Häkkinen)
1999: Electric picnik
2001: Marjaniemessä (At Marjaniemi)
2002: Valtatie (Highway)
as J. Karjalainen (2nd period)
2006: Lännen-Jukka (Western-Jukka)
2008: Paratiisin pojat (Boys of Paradise)
2010: Polkabilly Rebels
2013: Et ole yksin (You Are Not Alone)
2015: Sinulle, Sofia (For You, Sofia)
2018: Sä kuljetat mua (You drive me)
2022: Soulavaris

Live albums
as J. Karjalainen ja Mustat Lasit
1983: Tunnussävel (Theme Music)
1989: Live

Singles
As J. Karjalainen
2013: "Mennyt mies"

See also
List of best-selling music artists in Finland

References

Finnish male singer-songwriters
Living people
1957 births
Musicians from Helsinki
20th-century Finnish male singers
21st-century Finnish male singers